Pampanga has large and high-end malls in Central Luzon. SM City Pampanga is the oldest SM mall; it is the largest in the region and one of the longest malls in the Philippines. The Marquee Mall Ayala contains luxury shops and restaurants, and has a unique design.

Angeles City

San Fernando

References

 
Shopping malls in Pampanga